Live in Stockholm is a concert film by American singer-songwriter Rickie Lee Jones, released in July 2011. It was filmed on 7 March 2010 at Berns Salonger in Stockholm and it is her first live DVD. This unique concert film was conceived and directed by Grammy nominated director Ian McCrudden (Anita O' Day - The Life of a Jazz Singer).   In addition to Jones, this video also featured Lionel Cole (percussion) and Joey Maramba (bass).

Track listing
"It Takes You There"
"It Must Be Love"
"Satellites"
"Weasel and the White Boys Cool"
"Young Blood"
"Sailor Song"
"Bonfires"
"Second Chance"
"Living It Up"
"Pirates (So Long Lonely Avenue)"
"The Real End"
"We Belong Together"
"Wild Girl"
"Chuck E's in Love"
"Danny's All-Star Joint"

Personnel
Rickie Lee Jones – vocals, guitars, piano
Joey Maramba – bass guitar
Lionel Cole – drums, percussions

References

External links

2011 live albums
Rickie Lee Jones albums